Adobe Creative Cloud is a set of applications and services from Adobe Inc. that gives subscribers access to a collection of software used for graphic design, video editing, web development, photography, along with a set of mobile applications and also some optional cloud services. In Creative Cloud, a monthly or annual subscription service is delivered over the Internet. Software from Creative Cloud is downloaded from the Internet, installed directly on a local computer and used as long as the subscription remains valid. Online updates and multiple languages are included in the CC subscription. Creative Cloud was initially hosted on Amazon Web Services, but a new agreement with Microsoft has the software, beginning with the 2017 version, hosted on Microsoft Azure.

Previously, Adobe offered individual products as well as software suites containing several products (such as Adobe Creative Suite or Adobe eLearning Suite) with a perpetual software license.

Adobe first announced the Creative Cloud in October 2011. Another version of Adobe Creative Suite was released the following year. On May 6, 2013, Adobe announced that they would not release new versions of the Creative Suite and that future versions of its software would be available only through the Creative Cloud. The first new versions made only for the Creative Cloud were released on June 17, 2013.

Current applications and services
The Adobe Creative Cloud retains many of the features of Adobe Creative Suite and introduces new features; foremost is the instant availability of upgrades, saving to the cloud, and easier sharing. In June 2014, the company announced 14 new versions of the Creative Cloud essential desktop tools, four new mobile apps, and the availability of creative hardware for enterprise, education and photography customers.

The video disc authoring program Adobe Encore and the web-focused bitmap editor Adobe Fireworks were both discontinued by Adobe in 2013, but were still available as downloads via Creative Cloud until May 2019.

Packages
Adobe offers four tiers of the Creative Cloud subscription service for individuals (there are other types for Business and Schools):
 Photography, which contains some photography-related features of Adobe Creative Cloud and access to Photoshop CC and Lightroom CC.
 Single App, which contains all the features of Creative Cloud plus access to a single application of the user's choice in the suite out of a list of 11 selected applications. 
 All Apps, the main tier of Creative Cloud that contains all the features of Creative Cloud plus access to all applications within the suite.
 All Apps + Adobe Stock, which contains all the standard features of Creative Cloud plus features for Adobe Stock.

Desktop, mobile, and web services 
The following contains the services found on Creative Cloud.

Hidden helper tools 
 Adobe IPC Broker is an app bundled with Creative Cloud running in the background. This hidden program runs a process that integrates multiple Creative Cloud apps such as Photoshop or Illustrator.

Discontinued products 
 Dimension, formerly Project Felix, was a 3D rendering and design tool. It was replaced by Adobe Substance 3D Stager, which is not included in the All Apps plan and must be purchased separately.
 Flash Builder, formerly Flex Builder, was an integrated development environment (IDE) built on the Eclipse platform meant for developing rich Internet applications (RIAs) and cross-platform desktop applications for the Adobe Flash platform.
Flash Professional (now Adobe Animate) is Flash's content authoring application.
Fuse, formerly Fuse Character Creator, is a 3D character animation application originally developed by Mixamo. It was acquired by Adobe Systems in June 2015 and was discontinued while in beta testing.
Ideas CC is a mobile digital sketchpad app that lets you design almost anywhere using vectors, layers, and color themes.
Kuler CC, later called Adobe Color CC, was a color theming app for mobile devices. It was developed and marketed by Adobe Inc. through Adobe Creative Cloud.
 Muse is a discontinued offline website builder used to create fixed, fluid, or adaptive websites, without the need to write code.
Premiere Clip is a timeline based video editing software on mobile platform.
Preview CC is an app for previewing mobile designs.
Scout is a profiling tool for Flash SWF files.
SpeedGrade is a tool for performing color corrections and developing looks for Premiere projects. SpeedGrade was discontinued on August 22, 2017, but can still be used by subscribers at the time. Features from SpeedGrade are now found in the Lumetri Color Correction feature in Premiere Pro.
 Story was a screenwriting and film/TV pre-production online application which integrates with the Premiere Pro family. It allows users to create movie scripts for their movies.
Voco is an unreleased audio editing and generating prototype software by Adobe that enables novel editing and generation of audio.

Reception
The change from perpetual licenses to a subscription model was met with significant criticism. Although Adobe's cloud-based model caused disagreement and uncertainty, and incited annoyance and conflict, a survey by CNET and Jefferies revealed that despite complaints most of its 1.4 million subscribers plan to renew.

Criticism
Shifting to a software as a service model, Adobe announced more frequent feature updates to its products and the eschewing of their traditional release cycles. Customers must pay a monthly subscription fee. Consequently, if subscribers cancel or stop paying, they will lose access to the software as well as the ability to open work saved in proprietary file formats.

Although investors applauded the move, many customers reacted negatively. This shift has been met with mixed reviews by both corporations and independent designers, with many people expressing their displeasure on the web and through multiple Internet petitions. Among these was a Change.org petition which reached over 30,000 signatures within a few weeks of the announcement.

Creative Cloud has been criticized for broken file syncing, one of its core features. In May 2013 Adobe announced that it was suspending the file-sync desktop preview "for the next couple of weeks". Reviewers of Creative Cloud were disappointed with the functionality of the cloud storage and were "far from convinced by Adobe's subscription model". Some users were concerned that they would be forced to upgrade their computer hardware when it is no longer supported by the current version of the Creative Cloud software.

Some of their customers experienced a loss of trust in Adobe as a company and an attendant rise in anxiety. Despite significant customer criticism over Adobe's move to subscription-only pricing, the company announced that it would not sell perpetual licenses to its software alongside the subscriptions: "We understand this is a big change, but we are so focused on the vision we shared for Creative Cloud, and we plan to focus all our new innovation on the Creative Cloud".

In May 2014 the service was interrupted for over a day due to a login outage leaving graphics professionals locked out of Creative Cloud. Adobe apologized for this global Creative Cloud failure. When initially asked whether customers would be compensated, the company's Customer Service responded: "We cannot offer compensation for the outage. I'm so sorry again for the frustration." Adobe later announced that it would review compensation on "a case by case basis". The outage was heavily criticized, as was Adobe's software as a service model in general.

Online articles began offering examples of replacements of Adobe products, with competing products directly offering alternatives, and launching promotions for dissatisfied Adobe customers. Adobe, however, claimed that Creative Cloud is its "highest customer satisfaction product in the creative space" and that even prior to Adobe's move to a pure subscription model, "more than 80 percent of customers who bought products from Adobe's Web site picked CC over CS."

Although Creative Cloud was expected to curtail the piracy of Photoshop, which is one of the most pirated pieces of software, Creative Cloud was hacked and its applications made available via unauthorized means a day after it officially launched. Adobe claimed that the subscription payment plan would make its software more accessible to users who previously pirated it.

On May 14, 2019, some Creative Cloud users received emails from Adobe stating that licenses to previous versions of Creative Cloud applications had been terminated and that users could face civil action from third parties if they did not update the software on their personal computers. A representative from Adobe confirmed the letter's authenticity. The situation prompted renewed criticism of Adobe's subscription-only business model.

See also
 List of Adobe software

References

External links
 

Adobe software
 
Desktop publishing software
MacOS graphics software
MacOS multimedia software
Media readers
Photo software
Raster graphics editors
Technical communication tools
Typesetting software
Vector graphics editors
Windows graphics-related software
Windows multimedia software
2011 software
Subscription services